Area denial artillery munition (ADAM) is a family of United States land mines and 155 mm artillery projectiles.

The mines carried by these projectiles are the M67 long-duration anti-personnel mines and M72 short-duration anti-personnel landmines intended to maim or kill enemy combatants. The duration refers to the self-destruct time, which is set at the time of manufacture to 4 or 48 hours.

Once the mine lands, it launches seven tripwires before arming itself. Any disturbance of the tripwires will trigger the mine. The mine is entirely electrically detonated, if the battery level of the mine drops below a pre-set level - the mine self-destructs. Even if the mine does not self-destruct, the battery will fully discharge after 14 days, rendering the mine inactive.

The mines contain a spherical warhead in a void that also contains  of M10 liquid propellant. The void allows the propellant fluid to settle under gravity in the correct position beneath the warhead so that the warhead is always launched in an upward direction irrespective of the initial orientation of the mine.

Specifications

M67/M72 mine
 Self-destruct time: 
 M67: 48 hours
 M72: 4 hours
 Height: 82.5 mm
 Width: 57 mm
 Weight: 540 g
 Explosive content: 21.9 g of composition A5 (RDX/wax)

M692/M731 155 mm projectile
 Weight (fuzed): 46.7 kg
 Calibre: 155 mm
 Length: 899 mm
 Contents:
 M692: 36 M67 mines (long delay)
 M731: 36 M72 mines (short delay)

See also
Family of Scatterable Mines (FASCAM)
Remote Anti-Armor Mine System (RAAMS), the anti-armor equivalent of the ADAM
M86 Pursuit Deterrent Munition
Ottawa Treaty

References
 Jane's Mines and Mine Clearance 2005-2006

Anti-personnel mines
Land mines of the United States
Artillery ammunition